The 1992 Nigerian Senate election in Imo State was held on July 4, 1992, to elect members of the Nigerian Senate to represent Imo State. Bright Nwanne representing Imo East/Owerri Zone, Umar Nnani Maduagwu representing Imo West/Orlu Zone and B.C. Agunanne representing Imo North/Okigwe Zone all won on the platform of the National Republican Convention.

Overview

Summary

Results

Imo East/Owerri Zone 
The election was won by Bright Nwanne of the National Republican Convention.

Imo West/Orlu Zone 
The election was won by Umar Nnani Maduagwu of the National Republican Convention.

Imo North/Okigwe Zone 
The election was won by B.C. Agunanne of the National Republican Convention.

References 

Imo
Imo State Senate elections
July 1992 events in Nigeria